The 1964–65 Rugby Union County Championship was the 65th edition of England's premier rugby union club competition at the time.

Warwickshire continued their recent domination of the event after winning a fourth consecutive competition (and seventh time in eight years). They defeated Durham County in the final.

Final

See also
 English rugby union system
 Rugby union in England

References

Rugby Union County Championship
County Championship (rugby union) seasons